Yermilov, Yermylov, Ermylov or Ermilov is a Slavic masculine surname, its feminine counterpart is Yermilova, Yermylova, Ermylova or Ermilova. It may refer to
Aleksandr Ermilov (born 1954), Russian volleyball player
Aleksandr Yermilov (born 1960), Russian flatwater kayaker and sprint canoer 
Vasyl Yermylov (1894–1968), Ukrainian painter
Vitali Yermilov (born 1970), Russian football player

See also
Yermolov (disambiguation)